Judith White Playfair (born 14 September 1953) is an Australian  breaststroke swimmer of the 1960s, who won a silver medal in the 4×100-metre medley relay at the 1968 Summer Olympics in Mexico City.

Swimming career
Playfair was born in Rose Bay, New South Wales. She learned to swim at the age of four, at Watson's Bay Baths, and continued to train there two to three times a day from an early age. From 1965 to 1969 she was the New South Wales Junior and then Senior Breaststroke champion and record holder. She was the Australian 100m and 200m breaststroke champion from 1967 to 1969, and held both Australian and Commonwealth records.

In 1968, and still aged fourteen she was selected to represent Australia at the 1968 Mexico City Olympics. Playfair combined with Janet Steinbeck, Lyn McClements and Lynne Watson to register a silver medal in the 4×100-metre medley relay, trailing the Americans home by 1.7 seconds.  She was eliminated in the semifinals and heats of the 100-metre and 200-metre backstroke events respectively.  She was away from home and school for three months and had her 15th birthday whilst overseas.

She swam at the Australian National titles with an injury and was not selected for the 1970 Commonwealth Games squad at which point she retired from competitive swimming.

Professional career
Playfair studied arts and teaching at the University of Sydney. She taught Physical Education and HSIE at a number of comprehensive public schools in Sydney and in 2003 became the deputy principal of Canterbury Girls High School. She retired from teaching in 2009 and then worked at the University of Sydney.

Personal
Playfair is the granddaughter of the Sydney businessman, politician and soldier Thomas Alfred John Playfair. She attended Kambala School for her entire schooling. She is the aunt of New South Wales King's Cup winning and Australian representative rower Hamish Playfair.

See also
 List of Olympic medalists in swimming (women)

References

 

1953 births
Living people
Olympic swimmers of Australia
Australian female breaststroke swimmers
People from New South Wales
Swimmers at the 1968 Summer Olympics
Medalists at the 1968 Summer Olympics
Olympic silver medalists for Australia
Olympic silver medalists in swimming
People educated at Kambala School
20th-century Australian women
21st-century Australian women